Micromyrtus clavata is a plant species of the family Myrtaceae endemic to Western Australia.

It blooms between June and September producing white flowers.

It is found on slopes and winter wet areas as well as around granite rocks in the Wheatbelt and Goldfields-Esperance regions of Western Australia between Perenjori and Menzies where it grows in lateritic and granitic soils.

References

clavata
Endemic flora of Western Australia
Myrtales of Australia
Rosids of Western Australia
Plants described in 2006
Taxa named by Barbara Lynette Rye